Mukwonago  is a village in the U.S. state of Wisconsin. The population was 8,262 at the 2020 census. The village is located mostly within the Town of Mukwonago in Waukesha County, with a small portion extending into the Town of East Troy in Walworth County. Of its population, 8,040 are in Waukesha County and 222 are in Walworth County.

History
The area was originally a Native American village and the tribal seat of the Bear Clan of the Potawatomi Indians. The spelling "Mukwonago" was adopted in 1844 because of the similarity to nearby Mequon. Many of the streets and roads are named after the city's founders, such as Ira Blood, Major Jessie Meacham, Sewall Andrews, and Thomas Sugden.

Geography
Mukwonago is located at  (42.864557, −88.330619).

It is situated at the southwestern flank of the sprawling Vernon Marsh, and encircles Upper and Lower Phantom Lake(s). The lakes lie midway along the Mukwonago River from its source springs to its meeting with the Fox River, which travels further southeast through Big Bend and beyond. Upper (110 Acres) and Lower Phantom (373 Acres) Lakes are part of the Village of Mukwonago, managed by Phantom Lakes Management District (PhantomLakes.us).

Climate
Mukwonago has a hot summer and a cold winter (Köppen classification) humid continental climate.

Demographics

2020 census
At the 2020 census there were 8,262 people, 3,126 households, and 2,021 families living in the village. There were 3,474 housing units at an average density of 533.3 per square mile (206.0/km2). The racial makeup of the village was 89.0% White, 0.1% African American, 0.4% American Indian and Alaska Native, 4.0% Asian, 0.0% Native Hawaiian and Pacific Islander, and 4.9% from two or more races. Hispanic or Latino of any race were 7.0%.

Of the 3,126 households, 33.7% had children under the age of 18 living with them, 56.2% were married couples living together, 6.9% had a female householder with no spouse present, 1.5% had a male householder with no spouse present, and 35.3% were non-families. 29.1% of households were one person and 12.0% were one person aged 65 or older. The average household size was 2.59 and the average family size was 3.30. 

The median age in the village was 40.3 years; 23.7% of residents were under the age of 18; 6.7% were between the ages of 18 and 24; 27.5% were from 25 to 44; 25.1% were from 45 to 64; and 17.0% were 65 or older. The gender makeup of the village was 48.9% male and 51.1% female.

2010 census
At the 2010 census there were 7,355 people, 2,923 households, and 2,003 families living in the village. The racial makeup of the village was 97.4% White, 0.2% African American, 0.2% Native American, 0.9% Asian, 0.1% Pacific Islander, 0.3% from other races, and 0.9% from two or more races. Hispanic or Latino of any race were 3.2%.

Of the 2,923 households 35.6% had children under the age of 18 living with them, 54.9% were married couples living together, 8.6% had a female householder with no husband present, 5.1% had a male householder with no wife present, and 31.5% were non-families. 26.6% of households were one person and 10.7% were one person aged 65 or older. The average household size was 2.50 and the average family size was 3.05.

The median age in the village was 37.9 years. 26.2% of residents were under the age of 18; 7.2% were between the ages of 18 and 24; 28.1% were from 25 to 44; 26.2% were from 45 to 64; and 12.4% were 65 or older. The gender makeup of the village was 48.9% male and 51.1% female.

Education
The public schools serving Mukwonago are Mukwonago High School, Park View Middle School, Rolling Hills Elementary, Section Elementary, Big Bend Elementary, Eagleville Elementary, Prairie View Elementary, Clarendon Avenue Elementary, and Norris Academy.

Private schools include Mukwonago Baptist Academy, and St. John's Lutheran School.

Notable people
 Marvin H. Bovee, politician
 Matthias J. Bovee, politician
 Timothy T. Cronin, attorney and politician
 James H. Elmore, politician
 Scott Jensen, politician
 Nik Rettinger, politician
 Thomas Sugden (farmer-politician), politician
 Cody Horlacher, politician
 Laurel E. Youmans, politician
 Joseph Bond, politician
 Glenn Robert Davis, politician
 George Augustus Ray, politician
 Cadwallader Jackson Wiltse, politician
 Eugene W. Chafin, politician and writer
 Brad Schimel,  politician and lawyer
 John M. Barlow, politician and businessman
 Nick Pearson, Olympic speedskater 2002 & 2010 Winter Games
 Mary Beth Iagorashvili, Olympic pentathlete 2000 & 2004 Summer Games
 Fred Thomas (third baseman), MLB player for the Boston Red Sox
 A.J. Vukovich, Pro baseball player in the Arizona Diamondbacks organization
 Eric Szmanda, actor, CSI
 Mark Lambrecht, winner of the 5th season of The Mole (American TV series)
 Angie Jakusz, contestant on Survivor: Palau
 John J. Van Buren, United States Navy
 Paul Stender, best known for designing, building and driving some of the most extreme and fastest Jet/Turbine Engine powered land vehicles in the world.

References

External links
 Village of Mukwonago

Villages in Wisconsin
Villages in Walworth County, Wisconsin
Villages in Waukesha County, Wisconsin